Abdoulaye Youssouf Maïga (born 20 December 1988) is a Malian professional footballer who last played for Liga 1 club Persipura Jayapura as a centre back.

Club career
Born in Bamako, Maïga began his career with Stade Malien and was in 2007 promoted to the Malien Première Division team.

On 29 December 2010, Maïga signed a two and half year contract with Algerian club USM Alger.

International career
Maïga was part of the Mali national team at 2010 African Cup of Nations in Angola.

Career statistics

Club

Honours
Stade Malien
 CAF Confederation Cup: 2009
 Malian Première Division: 2010
 Super Coupe National du Mali: 2009

References

External links
 
 
 Abdoulaye Maïga Profile on Eyesoccer Football Database

1987 births
Living people
Sportspeople from Bamako
Association football defenders
Malian footballers
Mali international footballers
Stade Malien players
Expatriate footballers in Algeria
Malian expatriate sportspeople in Algeria
USM Alger players
Gazélec Ajaccio players
Ligue 2 players
Malian expatriate footballers
Expatriate footballers in France
Malian expatriate sportspeople in France
Algerian Ligue Professionnelle 1 players
2010 Africa Cup of Nations players
2012 Africa Cup of Nations players
Malian expatriate sportspeople in Indonesia
Expatriate footballers in Indonesia
Liga 1 (Indonesia) players
Terengganu F.C. II players
21st-century Malian people